is a Japanese manga series written by Nodoka Shinomaru. It began serialization in Shinchosha's magazine Monthly Comic @ Bunch in 2012 and has been collected into twelve tankōbon volumes. An anime television series adaptation by Liden Films aired from October 9 to December 25, 2016.

Plot
The series revolves around the complicated but normal life of Souta Tawara, a young web designer from Tokyo who decides to return to his hometown in  Kagawa following the death of his father and to take a break from the city. Upon his return, he sadly learns that the family restaurant had gone out of business during his absence; while reminiscing about his childhood, Souta walks inside the closed down restaurant and discovers a blonde haired little boy wearing rags sleeping inside a cooking pot. Then, Souta realizes that this child is a shape shifting tanuki that has been inhabiting Kagawa for many years. Thinking that the boy has been living a lonely life, he decides to adopt him and name him Poco.

Each episode follows the heartwarming relationship between Souta and Poco, and through the time they spend together, Souta recalls his own past, the place he left behind for the city, and the relationship he had with his father.

Characters

The main protagonist and the son of a noodle restaurant owner.  Born and raised in the Udon Prefecture (i.e., Kagawa Prefecture), he had been living an uneventful life in Tokyo as a web designer.  He comes home after his father's demise to find the restaurant having gone out of business and a young boy that he names Poco hiding there. He grows fond of him and decides to take care of him and constantly worries about what would happen to Poco once he leaves. He regrets leaving his home and his father because of his selfishness and mentions it to his big sister when she expresses her regret of being unable give their father a grandchild. His time spent with Poco often reminds him of how his father lovingly took care of him, which further adds to his regrets.

A young boy who is actually a magical tanuki (raccoon dog). He is adopted by Souta after he was found all alone hiding inside the closed-down restaurant.

Souta's friend from grade school.  He used to go fishing with Souta in the middle of the night before going to school.  He is now an orthopedic surgeon.

 
Souta's older sister. She's terrible with kids, but interacting with Poco and Souta changed that. She can come off as intimidating but she cares deeply about Souta's well-being. She regrets the fact that she couldn't give grandchildren to her father even though it was her own decision. She expresses her regret that they have to let go of the house that they grew up and played together which probably left some impression in Souta. She seems rather close to Souta and constantly worries about him probably because they lost their mother early. Whenever she's together with Souta they reminisce their childhood and their regrets. She has a sad expression whenever they reminisce their childhood probably because of the memories of her mother whom she probably remembers better than Souta does.

Priest who initially warns Souta that if a child wanders around alone in the area a tanuki could bewitch them - after Poco runs off chasing Kaeru and ends up at the temple. Sae's older brother and part-time DJ.

Former customer of Tawara Udon, who visited often, she is devastated to find out it is no longer in business upon first meeting Souta. Her workplace is situated around the corner from the noodle restaurant. Shunsuke's younger sister.

Souta's childhood friend.  Since graduating from high school, she got married and now goes by Mai Tanaka.  She is the mother to two children, Nozomi and baby boy Eitarou.

Mai's daughter.

Sharp-tongued granny from next door, at first she is critical of Souta upon his return and mistakes Poco as his secret love child.

Surgeon and Director of the local hospital, he operated on Souta when he sustained his leg injury as a teenager. He argues frequently with his son who works at another hospital in Ritsurin, raising doubts as to whether Shinobu will take over his hospital.

Nicknamed Dahama, Souta's boss at 'team satellite', the web design company he works at in Tokyo. He first encounters Souta when visiting a hospital where Souta, as a teen, was a patient due to a leg injury. Seeing his enthusiasm for building Nakajima's fishing website, Dahama invites him to Tokyo after his recovery.

Souta's younger colleague at 'team satellite' who looks up to him. Hiroshi is the one that calls Souta back to Tokyo, after he has spent two weeks away in Kagawa, when the company is in trouble due to being right up against a project deadline.

President of 'team planet', an advertising agency in Shodoshima, introduced to Souta by Dahama when he becomes a freelancer.

Works at 'team planet' and Manabu's wife.

Souta and Rinko's mother, she died more than 25 years before the current storyline.

Former owner of the noodle restaurant Tawara Udon, he is Souta and Rinko's father. Died recently - Souta is still in the mourning period when he returns to his hometown in Kagawa Prefecture.

Frog that lives near Tawara Udon and that Poco often chases.

An anime-only character, Udon Prefecture Vice Governor Kaname Jun, a native of Kagawa who provides preview narration and facts about the prefecture.

Gaogao-chan and the Blue Sky

A space alien from the Nebula M87 who crash-lands on Earth and comes to love it. Gaogao-chan is Poco's favorite TV character.
 
 and Shiho Kokido
Two kind mechanics who Gaogao-chan comes to live with.

Media

Manga
The original manga by Nodoka Shinomaru began serialization in Shinchosha's Monthly Comic @ Bunch magazine in August 2012. So far, twelve tankōbon volumes have been released by Shinchosha under the label Bunch Comics.

Volume list

Anime
A 12-episode anime television series adaptation was announced to air in October 2016. The anime was produced by Liden Films, directed by Seiki Takuno and written by Natsuko Takahashi. Eriko Itō handled the character designs and Yukari Hashimoto composed the music. It premiered on October 9, 2016 on NTV and later premiered on RNC on October 16, 2016. The opening theme is "S.O.S." by Weaver and the ending theme is "Sweet Darwin" by GOODWARP. Crunchyroll streamed the show as it aired, while Discotek Media released the show on Blu-ray on May 26, 2020.

Episode list

Notes

References

External links
  
  

Anime series based on manga
Kagawa Prefecture in fiction
Liden Films
Shinchosha manga
Seinen manga